Æthelwine,  also Aethelwine or Ethelwine is an Anglo-Saxon given name meaning "noble friend". Its Old High German equivalent is Adalwin.

Æthelwine of Abingdon (died 1030), abbot of Abingdon
Æthelwine (Bishop of Durham) (died 1071), bishop of Durham
Æthelwine of Lindsey, bishop of Lindsey
Æthelwine of Athelney, Anglo Saxon Saint
Æthelwine of Wells, bishop of Wells
 Æthelwine of Sceldeforde Anglo Saxon Saint
Æthelwine, Ealdorman of East Anglia (died 992), son of Æthelstan Half-King
Æthelwine, a son of Æthelweard (son of Alfred), who died in the Battle of Brunanburh (937)
Adalwin (died 816), bishop of Regensburg
Adalwin (died 873), bishop of Salzburg

See also
Edwin
Alwin
Alvin (disambiguation)